Marcus Svensson is a Swedish sport shooter born in 1990. At the 2012 Summer Olympics he competed in the Men's skeet, finishing in 7th place. At the 2016 Summer Olympics he competed in the Men's skeet and finished in second place, earning a silver medal for his native Sweden.

References

Swedish male sport shooters
Living people
Olympic shooters of Sweden
Shooters at the 2012 Summer Olympics
Shooters at the 2016 Summer Olympics
Olympic silver medalists for Sweden
Olympic medalists in shooting
Medalists at the 2016 Summer Olympics
European Games competitors for Sweden
Shooters at the 2019 European Games
1990 births
20th-century Swedish people
21st-century Swedish people